Charles Alvin Sanders (August 25, 1946  July 2, 2015) was an American professional football player who was a tight end for the Detroit Lions of the National Football League (NFL) from 1968 to 1977. Sanders was chosen for the NFL's 1970s All-Decade Team and voted into the Pro Football Hall of Fame in 2007.

Early years
Sanders was born in 1946 in Richlands, North Carolina. He attended James B. Dudley High School in Greensboro, North Carolina, where he played for the football, basketball, and baseball teams.

University of Minnesota
Sanders attended the University of Minnesota, where he played college football for the Golden Gophers. He was named to the All-Big Ten Conference Team in his senior year, when he recorded 21 receptions for 276 yards with two touchdowns, as Minnesota tied for the Big Ten championship with an 8–2 record.

Detroit Lions
The Lions selected Sanders in the third round of the 1968 NFL Draft, and he became their starting tight end for the next ten seasons.  He had 336 career receptions for 4,817 yards and 31 touchdowns. He was also known as a superior blocker. Sanders was chosen for the Pro Bowl seven times (1968–71, 1974–76). He was the only rookie to be named to the 1969 Pro Bowl, following a season where he had forty receptions for 533 yards. Sanders was also selected as a first-team All-Pro for the 1970 and 1971 seasons, receiving the most votes of any player in both years. During an exhibition game in 1976, he injured his right knee, but continued to play until his retirement at age 31 in November 1977.

Sanders was named to the NFL 1970s All-Decade Team as selected by voters of the Pro Football Hall of Fame. He was inducted into the North Carolina Sports Hall of Fame in 1997, and the Minnesota M Club Hall of Fame in 2013. In 2008, Sanders was chosen as a member of the Lions' 75th Anniversary All Time Team.

Later years
Sanders served as a color analyst on Lions radio broadcasts from 1983 through 1988, worked with the team as an assistant coach in charge of wide receivers from 1989 to 1996, returned to perform radio broadcasts in 1997, and then joined the Lions' front office as a scout. He became the team's assistant director of pro personnel in 2000, and held the role until his death.  In 2005, he co-authored Charlie Sanders' Tales from the Detroit Lions, a book of anecdotes about the team and its players.

Sanders also worked in the team's community relations department and served as a spokesman for the United Way and The March of Dimes. He created The Charlie Sanders Foundation in 2007, which provided two college scholarships per year for students from Oakland County, Monroe, Michigan and his home state of North Carolina. In 2012, he began the "Have A Heart Save A Life" program (within the foundation) to raise funds to provide heart (EKG) screenings to young people. In August 2012, the first "Charlie Sanders Have A Heart Save A Life Celebrity Golf Outing was held in West Bloomfield, Michigan. St. Jude Children's Research Hospital honored Sanders for his charitable work in 2014.

Personal life and death
Sanders and his wife, Georgianna, had nine children and lived in Rochester Hills, Michigan. Charlie has nine children Mia, Charese, Mary Jo, Georgianna jr, Charlie jr, Nathalie, Talissa, Wayne and Jordan.  One of his daughters, Mary Jo is a pro boxer, and three of his sons played college football: Charlie Sanders Jr. at Ohio State University and had a brief NFL career with the Detroit Lions; one son formerly played at Saginaw Valley State University; and one son is currently playing at Saginaw Valley State University, after transferring from Michigan State University.

Sanders developed a malignant tumor behind his right knee, which was discovered while he was undergoing knee replacement surgery. Sanders underwent chemotherapy, but died on July 2, 2015 in Royal Oak, Michigan from cancer.

References

External links
 
Pro Football Hall of Fame: Member profile
 

1946 births
2015 deaths
African-American players of American football
American football tight ends
Detroit Lions announcers
Detroit Lions players
Detroit Lions scouts
Minnesota Golden Gophers football players
National Conference Pro Bowl players
National Football League announcers
People from Richlands, North Carolina
Players of American football from Greensboro, North Carolina
Pro Football Hall of Fame inductees
Sportspeople from Greensboro, North Carolina
Western Conference Pro Bowl players
Deaths from bone cancer
Deaths from cancer in Michigan
20th-century African-American sportspeople
21st-century African-American people